Barres is one of nine parishes (administrative divisions) in Castropol, a municipality within the province and autonomous community of Asturias, in northern Spain.

The population is 652 (INE 2005).

References

Transportation
 How to travel to Barres, on Moovit

Parishes in Castropol